William Timothy Mantlo (born November 9, 1951) is an American comic book writer, primarily at Marvel Comics.  He is  best known for his work on two licensed toy properties whose adventures occurred in the Marvel Universe: Micronauts and Rom, as well as co-creating the characters Rocket Raccoon and Cloak and Dagger.  An attorney who worked as a public defender, Mantlo was the victim of a hit-and-run accident in 1992 and has been in institutional care ever since.

Early life
Bill Mantlo was born in Brooklyn, New York City, the oldest of three sons of William W. and Nancy Mantlo. Growing up as a comics fan, Mantlo attended Manhattan's High School of Art & Design. In college at the Cooper Union School of Art, he focused on painting and photography. Following his graduation, Mantlo held various civil service positions and worked as a portrait photographer.

Career

Comics
A connection with a college friend in 1974 led Mantlo to a job as an assistant to Marvel Comics production manager John Verpoorten. Mantlo's first credits were as a colorist, on several comics cover-dated from October 1974 to April 1975. Soon afterword, Mantlo wrote a fill-in script for a Sons of the Tiger story in Deadly Hands of Kung Fu, which led to a permanent writing position on that title. While scripting Deadly Hands, Mantlo and artist George Pérez created White Tiger, comics' first superhero of Hispanic descent.

Around this time, Marvel's then editor-in-chief Marv Wolfman instituted a policy to avoid the many missed deadlines plaguing the company. The policy was to have fill-in stories at the ready, should a title be in danger of missing its deadline. Mantlo quickly became the "fill-in king", creating stories under very tight deadlines, many of which did find their way into print. Wolfman explained that Mantlo "was both good and fast and at that point didn't have a lot of regular assignments." By the mid to late 1970s he had written issues of nearly every Marvel title.

Later, he became a regular writer at Marvel, notably for the licensed properties Micronauts and Rom, also known as Rom: Spaceknight. Mantlo recalled how one Christmas, he examined some action figures from Mego Corporation's Micronauts line, given to his son Adam. He said he began to envision the characters "as small, microscopic even, inhabiting an other-verse apart from, but conjunctive with ours," and specified that,

Mantlo convinced then-editor-in-chief Jim Shooter to obtain the comics license for these toys; Shooter then hired Mantlo to script their series. Mantlo and artist Michael Golden created the Micronauts' backstory of history, mythology, personalities, and an alphabet. Micronauts, along with Moon Knight and Ka-Zar the Savage, became one of Marvel's first ongoing series to be distributed exclusively to comic book stores beginning with issue #38 (Feb. 1982).

Mantlo's first run on The Spectacular Spider-Man featured frequent appearances by the White Tiger. He used the series to wrap up unresolved plot elements from The Champions series and wrote a multiple-issue storyline that included the first work by artist Frank Miller on the Daredevil character. Mantlo concluded his first run on the series with a crossover with the Fantastic Four #218 (May 1980). Mantlo, Mark Gruenwald, and Steven Grant co-wrote Marvel Treasury Edition #25 (1980) which featured a new story starring Spider-Man vs. the Hulk set at the 1980 Winter Olympics.

While writing The Champions he collaborated with artist Bob Hall, who said in 2013, "Bill was a peach — very helpful to me as I got started [in the comics profession] ... I think we were both as enthusiastic as we could get about this particular comic, but more because we were working at Marvel than because of the book itself."

Mantlo began writing The Incredible Hulk with issue #245 (March 1980). His five-year run on the series was noted for his depiction of the Hulk as highly emotional and humanized, rather than bestial and savage. Among the adversaries he created for the series were the U-Foes and the Soviet Super-Soldiers. Summarizing his early years with the Hulk, Mantlo remarked, "I did retreads of old Hulk stories to try and find a new direction, and just kept doing more and more repetition of what had already happened. Then [editor] Al Milgrom said, ‘Well, don’t accept this. If you want to make changes, make them. Take some risks.’ That’s when we decided to give Hulk Bruce Banner’s intelligence. From that point on I felt as if I had finally had a direction and control over the character. So I guess I took a year and half or maybe two years to get to the point." Mantlo and artist Ed Hannigan co-created the superhero pair Cloak and Dagger in The Spectacular Spider-Man #64 (March 1982). Mantlo, Gruenwald, and Grant reunited to co-write Marvel Super Hero Contest of Champions, the first limited series published by Marvel Comics. Other work by Mantlo includes runs as the regular writer on Iron Man and Alpha Flight.

Public defender
By the mid-1980s, he was enrolled in law school. Though he continued writing for Marvel, his workload began to decrease due to disputes with management. He wrote briefly for DC Comics in 1988, scripting the Invasion! miniseries. By this time he had passed the bar exam, and in 1987 began working as a Legal Aid Society public defender in The Bronx.

Personal life
Mantlo was married to Karen Mantlo (née Pocock), for some years a letterer in the comics industry. They have a son, Adam, and a daughter, Corinna (born 1980).

On July 17, 1992, Mantlo was struck by a car while rollerblading. The driver of the car fled the scene and was never identified. Mantlo suffered severe head trauma. According to his biographer, cartoonist David Yurkovich, in 2006, "For a while Bill was comatose. Although no longer in a coma, the brain damage he suffered in the accident is irreparable. His activities of daily living are severely curtailed and he resides in a healthcare facility where he receives full-time care."

When Marvel Studios produced Guardians of the Galaxy, they negotiated a compensation package for the rights to Rocket Raccoon. Mantlo's brother credited this arrangement for ensuring he would have care for the rest of his life. They also arranged for Mantlo to have private screenings of that film and its sequel.

Awards
Micronauts won the 1979 Eagle Award for Favourite New Comic Title.

In 2014, Mantlo received the Bill Finger Award.

Selected bibliography

Marvel Comics

 Alpha Flight #29–66, Annual #1–2 (1985–1989)
 Amazing Adventures (Killraven) #33, 38 (1975–1976)
 Amazing High Adventure #4-5 (1986)
 The Amazing Spider-Man #181, 222, 237, Annual #10–11, 17 (1976–1983)
 Astonishing Tales #32–35 (1975–1976)
 The Avengers #174, 188, 206, 210, Annual #9, 12 (1978–1983)
 Battlestar Galactica #8-9 (1979)
 Captain America #256, 291 (1981-1984)
 Champions #8–17 (1976–1978)
 Cloak and Dagger (1983–1984 mini-series) #1–4, (1985–1987 ongoing series) #1–11
 Daredevil #140 (1976)
 Deadly Hands of Kung Fu #7–14, 16–27, 29–32 (1974–1977)
 Defenders #30 (1975)
 Epic Illustrated #5 (1981)
 Fantastic Four #172, 182–183, 193–194, 216–218, Annual #13 (1976–1980)
 Fear #29-31 (1975)
 Frankenstein #18 (1975)
 Ghost Rider #16 (1976)
 Heroes for Hope: Starring the X-Men #1 (1985)
 Howard the Duck (comic book series) #30–31 (black-and-white magazine) #1–9 (1979–1981)
 Human Fly #1-19 (1977-1979)
 The Incredible Hulk #245–313, Annual #10–13 (1980–1985)
 The Incredible Hulk Versus Quasimodo #1 (1983)
 Iron Man #78, 86–87, 95–115, Annual #4 (1975–1978)
 Jack of Hearts #1–4 (1984 mini-series)
 John Carter, Warlord of Mars Annual #2 (1978)
 Man from Atlantis #1-7 (1978)
 Marvel Chillers: Modred the Mystic #1-2 (1975)
 Marvel Classics Comics #15 (adaptation of Treasure Island), 18 (adaptation of The Odyssey)
 Marvel Fanfare #7, 16, 19, 25, 27-28, 43, 47, 56-58 (1983-1991)
 Marvel Graphic Novel #14 (1985)
 Marvel Graphic Novel: Cloak and Dagger and Power Pack: Shelter from the Storm #1 (1990)
 Marvel Graphic Novel: Cloak and Dagger: Predator and Prey #1 (1988)
 Marvel Premiere #26, 28, 31, 44 (1975-1978)
 Marvel Preview #4, 7, 10, 22, 24 (1976–1980)
 Marvel Spotlight #27 (1976)
 Marvel Spotlight vol. 2 #9-11 (1980-1981)
 Marvel Super Hero Contest of Champions #1-3 (1982)
 Marvel Super-Heroes vol. 2 #10, 15 (1992-1993)
 Marvel Super Special #25, 31, 33 (1983-1984)
 Marvel Team-Up #38–51, 53–56, 72, 134–135, 140, Annual #1, 6 (1975–1984)
 Marvel Two-in-One #11–12, 14–19, 21–24, 47–48, 99 (1975–1983)
 Micronauts #1–58, Annual #1–2 (1979–1984)
 Power Man #27, 29 (1975-1976)
 Questprobe #1 (1984)
 Rawhide Kid #1–4 (1985 mini-series)
 Red Sonja #5-7 (1985)
 Rocket Raccoon #1–4 (1985 mini-series)
 Rom #1–75, Annual #1–4 (1979–1986)
 Savage Sword of Conan #110 (1985)
 Sectaurs #1–8 (1985–1986)
 Skull the Slayer #5-8 (1976)
 Son of Satan #8 (1977)
 The Spectacular Spider-Man #6, 9–10, 12–15, 17–34, 36–40, 42, 53, 61–89, 104, 120, Annual #1, 4 (1977–1986)
 Strange Tales vol. 2 #1-6 (1987)
 Super-Villain Team-Up #4, 9-14 (1976-1977)
 Swords of the Swashbucklers #1–12 (1985–1987)
 Tarzan #22-29, Annual #2-3 (1978-1979)
 Team America #3-9 (1982-1983)
 Thor #240–241, 309 (1975–1981)
 Transformers #1–2 (1985)
 The Vision and the Scarlet Witch #1–4 (1982–1983 mini-series)
 Web of Spider-Man #11
 What If...? #21, 31, 36 (1980-1982)
 X-Men #96, 106 (1975–1977)
 X-Men and the Micronauts #1–4 (1984 mini-series)

Other publishers
 Creepy #109 (Warren Publishing) (1979)
 Invasion! #1–3 (DC Comics) (1989)

See also 
 Roger Slifer

Notes

References

External links

ComicBookRealm.com: Bill Mantlo
Bill Mantlo at the Unofficial Handbook of Marvel Comics Creators 
Howling Curmudgeons: A Tribute to Bill Mantlo
The Hulk Library: Tribute to Bill Mantlo
Summit Business Media: National Underwriter Life & Health: Tragic Tale (archived here)
Summit Business Media: National Underwriter Life & Health: Make Mine Mantlo (editorial based on "Tragic Tale")
Tragic Tale: Bill's Last Words (the last entries from Mantlo's journal, 1995)

1951 births
American comics writers
Bill Finger Award winners
Cooper Union alumni
High School of Art and Design alumni
Living people
Marvel Comics writers
New York (state) lawyers
People with traumatic brain injuries
Public defenders
Writers from Brooklyn